Canadian Rockies Regional Division No. 12 or Canadian Rockies Public Schools is a public school authority within the Canadian province of Alberta operated out of Canmore.

Schools
Canadian Rockies Public Schools' of continuum grades are commonly found in two grade level groupings: kindergarten through grade three being Elementary and grades 7 through 12 being Secondary. Further, Secondary grade groupings can be broken into Middle School (4-8) and Senior High (9-12) schools. However, there are certain schools that include more than one grade level grouping or don't conform to the grouping system.

Elementary schools

Elementary Schools offer instruction from kindergarten to grade three, unless otherwise noted.

 Alpenglow School (K–6)
 Banff Elementary School (K–6)
 Elizabeth Rummel School

Middle Schools
Middle Schools offer instruction from grades four to eight, unless otherwise noted.
 Lawrence Grassi Middle School

Secondary schools
Secondary Schools (combined Junior/Senior High) offer instruction from grade seven through twelve, and offer 10, 20 and 30 level courses, unless otherwise noted.
 Banff Community High School

Senior High Schools 
Senior High Schools offer instruction for grades nine, ten, eleven, and twelve, and offer 10, 20 and 30 level courses, unless otherwise noted.

 Canmore Collegiate High School

Combined Schools

Combined Elementary/Middle Schools 
Combined Elementary/Middle Schools offer instruction from kindergarten through grade eight, unless otherwise noted.
 Exshaw School

Secondary schools
Secondary Schools (combined Junior/Senior High) offer instruction from grade seven through twelve, and offer 10, 20 and 30 level courses, unless otherwise noted.
 Banff Community High School

Other schools

 Canadian Rockies Outdoor Learning Centre

See also 
List of school authorities in Alberta

External links

References 

 
Canmore, Alberta
School districts in Alberta